Barbara N. Moser (born 1970) is an Austrian concert pianist.

Life 
Born in Vienna, one of the youngest students at the University of Music and Performing Arts Vienna at the age of five, she received her training with Heinz Medjimorec and subsequently with Greta Kraus in Toronto, Boris Bloch in Essen and Oleg Maisenberg, Roland Keller and Rudolf Buchbinder in Vienna.

In addition to her activities as a soloist and guest of well-known orchestras under renowned conductors, Moser devotes herself to chamber music, often performing with members of the Vienna Philharmonic. She is also interested in working with singers, and has accompanied Annette Dasch, Natalie Dessay, Mara Zampieri, Placido Domingo, Adrian Eröd, Wolfgang Holzmair, Anton Scharinger, Michael Schade, Mathias Zachariassen and the Arnold Schoenberg Choir among others.

As support for her doctoral studies, completed in 2007, and the publication of her dissertation "Vincenzo Bellinis opera La sonnambula - Verzierverhalten und allgemeine Aufführungspraxis auf Tonträgern sowie in älteren Quellen", she received scholarships from the "Emanuel und Sofie Fohn-Stipendienstiftung" and a "Best Publication Award 2010" from the University of Music Vienna, to which she was appointed professor of piano in March 2012. Since June 2018 she has been president of the Mozartgemeinde Wien.

A number of CD recordings attest to her versatility.

In 2005, she received the Wiener Flötenuhr.

References

External links 
 
 Solo CDs
 Barbara Moser on the site web of the Universität für Musik und darstellende Kunst Wien
 Discography on Allmusic

Austrian classical pianists
Women classical pianists
Academic staff of the University of Music and Performing Arts Vienna
University of Music and Performing Arts Vienna alumni
1970 births
Living people
Musicians from Vienna